Javier Santos (born 21 March 1972) is an Ecuadorian swimmer. He competed in the men's 4 × 100 metre freestyle relay and men's 4 × 200 metre freestyle relay events at the 1996 Summer Olympics.

References

1972 births
Living people
Ecuadorian male freestyle swimmers
Olympic swimmers of Ecuador
Swimmers at the 1996 Summer Olympics
Place of birth missing (living people)
20th-century Ecuadorian people